Thomas Collier RI (12 November 1840 – 14 May 1891) was an English landscape painter.

Biography
Collier was born in Glossop in Derbyshire, the son of Martha Siddall and Thomas Collier, who was a prosperous grocer and tea dealer. He received tuition at the Manchester School of Art and, inspired by David Cox's example, lived at Betws-y-Coed in northern Wales between 1864 and 1869. He moved to London in about 1870 on being elected to the New Water Colour Society.

Collier was a close friend of Charles Stuart Millard, the Canadian-born painter (who moved to England before 1879 and was employed as an instructor at the South Kensington Art School, before taking up an appointment as Headmaster at the Cheltenham School of Art).

Although not a prolific worker or exhibitor, he is regarded as one of the finest of English landscape watercolourists. He was made a Chevalier of the Legion of Honour in recognition of a painting sent to the Paris International Exhibition of 1878. Collier was industrious, retiring and often in poor health, yet financially independent, able to work without pandering to popular taste and to travel at will into the Suffolk countryside. In 1879 he arranged for the construction of a large house and studio at 9 Hampstead Hill Gardens in Hampstead where he spent his days painting and entertaining artist friends.

Collier died in Hampstead, London in 1891 and was buried in a family grave on the western side of Highgate Cemetery.

Gallery

Bibliography

Bury, Adrian. The life and art of Thomas Collier, R. I., Chevalier of the legion of honour 1840-1891, with a treatise on the English water-colour (London: F. Lewis, 1944).

References

External links
Cromer (watercolour - Tate online)

1840 births
1891 deaths
Burials at Highgate Cemetery
19th-century English painters
English male painters
English watercolourists
Landscape artists
People from Glossop
19th-century English male artists